David J. Gingery (December 19, 1932 – May 3, 2004) was an inventor, writer, and machinist, best known for his series of books on how to build machine tools.

Gingery is most famous for his Build Your Own Metal Working Shop From Scrap series, which details how to build a reasonably complete machine shop at low cost, often from scrap metal and other items. The hobbyist starts by constructing a small foundry capable of melting silicon-aluminum and zinc alloys from recycled automotive parts. Then green sand castings are used to make a metal lathe. The lathe is the first machine built since it can be used to help build itself. The lathe and foundry are then used to make more complicated machine tools.

The books in the series are, in the suggested sequence of construction:

 The Charcoal Foundry
 The Metal Lathe
 The Metal Shaper
 The Milling Machine
 The Drill Press
 The Dividing Head & Deluxe Accessories
 Designing & Building The Sheet Metal Brake

There is another book by Gingery, not usually counted as part of the series, entitled Building a Gas Fired Crucible Furnace, which can be substituted for that describing the charcoal foundry.

The dominant themes of the series are recycling, using inexpensive and free materials, and bootstrapping the shop's capabilities.  Gingery is noted for using basic methods, seldom used today, in order to make it possible for a skilled hobbyist to build the machines in the book series, usually without the aid of power tools or other expensive instruments.

In addition to the Build Your Own Metal Working Shop From Scrap series, Dave Gingery and his son Vincent have published a large number of booklets on shop practices, engine construction and mechanical miscellanea.

He was also a devoted amateur musician (primarily tenor banjo) and vocalist performing the music of the Great American Songbook and classic country.  He told the story of practicing yodelling out in the middle of a field at his farm, before finally realizing he couldn't do it as well as he wanted.

Links and references
Gingery's website
A large Yahoo Group dedicated to Gingery machines
Illustrated building of the Gingery lathe

American technology writers
1932 births
2004 deaths
20th-century American inventors